Albert Mockel (27 December 1866 – 30 January 1945) was a Belgian Symbolist poet. Born in Ougrée, he was the editor of La Wallonie, an influential journal of Belgian, and even European, Symbolism. He died in January 1945 in Ixelles.

Publications
Chantefable un peu naïve (1891)
Stéphane Mallarmé, un héros (1898)
Propos de littérature (1894)
Émile Verhaeren (1895)
Clartés (1901)
Contes pour les enfants d'hier (1908)
La Flamme stérile (1923)
La Flamme immortelle (1924)

References

External links
 Albert Mockel at ARLLFB 

1866 births
1945 deaths
People from Seraing
Belgian poets in French
Symbolist poets
Walloon movement activists
Members of the Académie royale de langue et de littérature françaises de Belgique